Mady Mesplé (7 March 1931 – 30 May 2020) was a French opera singer, considered the leading coloratura soprano of her generation in France, and sometimes heralded as the successor to Mado Robin, with Lakmé by Delibes becoming her signature role internationally.

She sang professionally for more than thirty years, with a repertoire that ranged from operetta to contemporary works. After retiring from the stage, she started teaching. Mesplé was the archetype of a light coloratura soprano: technically secure, musically distinctive, and with a charming stage presence. When she developed Parkinson's disease in the mid-1990s, she responded by writing a book about her career and the development of her illness.

Biography 
Born Madeleine Mesplé in Toulouse on 7 March 1931, she came from a modest family background. Her father Pierre was an accountant and her mother Yvonne (Sesquiere) a secretary.
She studied piano and voice, graduating with a gold medal. She played the piano in a local ballroom orchestra for a while and later left for Paris for complementary voice lessons with French soprano Janine Micheau.

Mesplé made her professional debut in Liège in January 1953, in the title role of Lakmé by Delibes, a role with which she remained closely associated throughout her career, singing it an estimated 145 times. Lakmé was also her debut role at La Monnaie in Brussels in 1954. She quickly established herself in the standard lyric and coloratura roles of the French repertoire, such as Olympia in The Tales of Hoffmann, Philline in Mignon, Leila in Les pêcheurs de perles, Juliette in Roméo et Juliette, Ophélie in Hamlet, the title roles of Dinorah and Manon, and Sophie in Werther.

She made her debut at the Aix-en-Provence Festival in 1956, as Zémire in Grétry's Zémire et Azor. The same year she first sang at the Opéra-Comique, again as Lakmé. Her Palais Garnier debut took place in 1958, as Constance in Poulenc's Dialogues des Carmélites. There in 1960, she took over from Joan Sutherland in a new production of Donizetti's Lucia di Lammermoor. Other Italian roles included Amina in Bellini's La sonnambula, Rosina in Rossini's Il barbiere di Siviglia, Norina in Donizetti's Don Pasquale and Gilda in Verdi's Rigoletto. She sang only a few German roles: the Queen of the Night in Mozart's Die Zauberflöte, Sophie in Der Rosenkavalier, and Zerbinetta in Ariadne auf Naxos, both by Richard Strauss.

Mesplé also enjoyed a successful career abroad, appearing at the Bolshoi Theatre in Moscow, the Royal Opera House in London, La Scala in Milan, the Metropolitan Opera in New York, where she appeared as Gilda, and Teatro Colón in Buenos Aires, where she sang the role of Olympia.

During the 1960s, Mesplé appeared frequently on French television and started exploring works by contemporary musicians. Charles Chaynes composed his Four Poems of Sappho for her, and in 1963 she appeared as Kitty in the French premiere of Gian Carlo Menotti's The Last Savage. She was also the first to sing the French version of Henze's Elegy for Young Lovers in 1965, and Pierre Boulez chose Mesplé for his performances of Schoenberg's Jacob's Ladder.

During the 1970s she added operettas to her repertoire, especially by Jacques Offenbach, such as La Vie parisienne, Orphée aux enfers and La Grande-Duchesse de Gérolstein, opposite Régine Crespin.

Mesplé retired from the stage in 1985 and turned to teaching at the École Normale de Musique de Paris and at the Music Conservatory of Lyon. After her retirement, she continued to perform recitals until the early 1990s.

Mesplé left a discography encompassing opera, operetta, and mélodies, including complete opera and operetta recordings of rarely performed works such as Auber's Fra Diavolo and Manon Lescaut, Lecocq's La fille de Madame Angot, Planquette's Les cloches de Corneville, Ganne's Les saltimbanques, Messager's Véronique, and Hahn's Ciboulette. She recorded Lakmé, alongside Charles Burles and Roger Soyer, conducted by Alain Lombard.

The archetype of the light French coloratura soprano, Mady Mesplé was noted for her technical security, musical refinement and charming stage presence. Her voice was particularly recognisable for its quick vibrato, intensely focused intonation, the instrumental-like quality of her runs and an amazing upper register extending easily to high A-flat. The French baritone Ludovic Tézier tweeted after her death: "". ("Mady Mesplé has flown away, lightly as elegance".)

In the mid-1990s, Mesplé began suffering from Parkinson's disease, leading her to work closely with the "Association France Parkinson" and to write a book, entitled La Voix du Corps ("The Voice of the Body"), about her career and the development of her illness. She died on 30 May 2020 in her native Toulouse.

Awards 
 2001: Officier of the Legion of Honour
 2009: Grand Officier of the Ordre national du Mérite
 2011: Commandeur of the Legion of Honour
 2011: Prize in honorem from the Académie Charles-Cros for her entire career
 2015: Grand Officier of the Legion of Honour
 2019: Grand Cross of the Ordre national du Mérite

References

Cited sources 
 Alain Pâris, Dictionnaire des interprètes et de l’interprétation musicale au XX siècle (2 vols), Éditions Robert Laffont (Bouquins, Paris 1982, 4th Edn. 1995, 5th Edn 2004). 
 Roland Mancini and Jean-Jacques Rouveroux,  (orig. H. Rosenthal and J. Warrack, French edition), Guide de l’opéra, Les indispensables de la musique (Fayard, 1995).

External links

 
 
 Kurt Gänzl: Remembering Mady Mesplé – France's “Madame Opérette” operetta-research-center.org 31 May 2020

1931 births
2020 deaths
Musicians from Toulouse
French operatic sopranos
Grand Officiers of the Légion d'honneur
Grand Cross of the Ordre national du Mérite
Grand Officers of the Ordre national du Mérite
Academic staff of the École Normale de Musique de Paris
20th-century French women opera singers
Deaths from Parkinson's disease
Neurological disease deaths in France
EMI Classics and Virgin Classics artists